Marvel Absurd was a Marvel Comics imprint under which comics based on Ren & Stimpy, Earthworm Jim and Beavis and Butt-Head were published.

Beavis and Butt-Head
Beavis and Butt-Head comics were published between March 1994 and June 1996. The comic captilised on the success of the animated television show. Rick Parker was an artist for the comic book.

Earthworm Jim
Three issues of the comic were published, based on the animated television show of the time. It was written by Dan Slott and drawn by Barry Crain, Manny Galan and Carlos Garzon.

Ren & Stimpy
Ren & Stimpy comic issues ran from #1–35 published by Marvel Comics, then subsequent issues #36–44 were published by Marvel Absurd.

References

1994 comics debuts
1996 comics endings
Marvel Comics imprints
Humor comics